Lieutenant General Robert Graham William Hawkins Stone CB, DSO, MC (16 January 189027 June 1974) was a senior British Army officer who became General Officer Commanding (GOC) British Troops in Egypt.

Military career
As a child aged 12, Stone travelled to South Africa, enlisted in the District Mounted Troop, Aliwal North in early 1902, and fought as a private soldier in the Second Boer War.

Subsequently educated at Wellington College, Stone was commissioned into the Royal Engineers in 1909. He served in the First World War in France, latterly as brigade major for 32nd Infantry Brigade. After attending the Staff College, Camberley from 1923 to 1924, he became a general staff officer at the War Office in 1930, Commander Royal Engineers for Deccan District in India in 1934 and military attaché in Rome in 1935. He went on to be assistant commandant and chief of staff in Sudan in 1938.

Stone also served in the Second World War, initially as chief of British Mission to the Egyptian Army and then, from 1942 as general officer commanding the British Troops in Egypt. In this capacity he had to maintain control during a coup d'état that resulted in Ahmad Pasha becoming Prime Minister of Egypt in 1944 as well as a subsequent mutinies within the Egyptian Army.

He retired in 1947.

References

Bibliography

External links
Generals of World War II

1890 births
1974 deaths
People from Dover, Kent
British Army generals of World War II
Royal Engineers officers
Companions of the Order of the Bath
Companions of the Distinguished Service Order
Recipients of the Military Cross
People educated at Wellington College, Berkshire
Graduates of the Royal Military Academy, Woolwich
Graduates of the Staff College, Camberley
British Army personnel of the Second Boer War
British Army lieutenant generals
Military personnel from Kent
British military attachés